John Mitten (born 30 March 1941) is an English former sportsman who played both football and cricket during the 1950s, '60s and '70s.

Football career

Born in Manchester, Mitten played as a left winger for Mansfield Town, Newcastle United, Leicester City, Coventry City, Plymouth Argyle, Exeter City, Bath City and Trowbridge Town, making 203 appearances in the Football League. After retiring as a player, Mitten became a manager, and was in charge of Tiverton Town and Sidmouth Town.

He is the son of fellow footballer Charlie Mitten.

Cricket career
He was active from 1958 to 1963 for Leicestershire. He appeared in 14 first-class matches as a right-handed batsman who kept wicket. He scored 259 runs with a highest score of 50* and completed 23 catches.

References

1941 births
Living people
English cricketers
English footballers
Footballers from Manchester
Leicestershire cricketers
Mansfield Town F.C. players
Newcastle United F.C. players
Leicester City F.C. players
Coventry City F.C. players
Plymouth Argyle F.C. players
Exeter City F.C. players
Bath City F.C. players
Trowbridge Town F.C. players
English Football League players
Association football wingers
English football managers
Tiverton Town F.C. managers